Đorđe Đurić may refer to:
 Đorđe Đurić (volleyball) (born 1971), Serbian volleyball player
 Đorđe Đurić (footballer) (born 1991), Serbian football player